The 1988 San Diego Padres season was the 20th season in franchise history. Tony Gwynn set a National League record by having the lowest batting average (.313) to win a batting title.

Offseason
 December 8, 1987: Rodney McCray was drafted from the Padres by the Chicago White Sox in the 1987 minor league draft.
 February 12, 1988: Rich Gossage and Ray Hayward were traded by the Padres to the Chicago Cubs for Keith Moreland and Mike Brumley.

Regular season
Team president Chub Feeney resigned after giving the finger to fans carrying a sign reading "SCRUB CHUB" on Fan Appreciation Night.

Opening Day starters

Season standings

Record vs. opponents

Notable transactions
 June 1, 1988: Andy Benes was drafted by the Padres in the first round of the 1988 Major League Baseball draft.
 June 8, 1988: Candy Sierra was traded by the Padres to the Cincinnati Reds for Dennis Rasmussen.

Roster

Player stats

Batting

Starters by position
Note: Pos = Position; G = Games played; AB = At bats; H = Hits; Avg. = Batting average; HR = Home runs; RBI = Runs batted in

Other batters
Note: G = Games played; AB = At bats; H = Hits; Avg. = Batting average; HR = Home runs; RBI = Runs batted in

Pitching

Starting pitchers
Note: G = Games pitched; IP = Innings pitched; W = Wins; L = Losses; ERA = Earned run average; SO = Strikeouts

Other pitchers
Note: G = Games pitched; IP = Innings pitched; W = Wins; L = Losses; ERA = Earned run average; SO = Strikeouts

Relief pitchers
Note: G = Games pitched; W = Wins; L = Losses; SV = Saves; ERA = Earned run average; SO = Strikeouts

Award winners
 Tony Gwynn, National League Batting Champion, .313  
1988 Major League Baseball All-Star Game

Farm system

LEAGUE CHAMPIONS: Las Vegas, Riverside, Spokane

References

External links
 1988 San Diego Padres at Baseball Reference
 1988 San Diego Padres at Baseball Almanac

San Diego Padres seasons
San Diego Padres season
San Diego Padres